Petrovsk-Zabaykalsky is a town and the administrative center of Petrovsk-Zabaykalsky District of Zabaykalsky Krai, Russia, located along the Balyaga River in the valley between Zagan-Daban and Zagorinsky mountain ranges,  southwest of Chita. Population:

History
Before the exploration expeditions of the Russian Cossacks in the 17th century, the future Petrovsk-Zabaykalsky's location was a route junction of nomadic Buryat tribes. Peter the Great granted the heads of the tribes with principality. The settlement, founded in 1789 and known then as Petrovsky Zavod, grew and developed around its iron refinery. From 1830 to 1839, it was a detention place for seventy-one Decembrists and ten of their wives, who were sent here from Chita. There is a commemorating mark on the railway station. In a restored house of the princess Ekaterina Troubetskaya, wife of Sergey Trubetskoy, was organized a museum, which opened on October 10, 1980. In Petrovsk-Zabaykalsky's historical district there are several buildings related to the times of Decembrists in the town.

In 1926, the settlement was granted town status and given its present name.

In 1940, a new iron refinery was built, which was one of the most important iron factories in the region during the following decades.

Administrative and municipal status
Within the framework of administrative divisions, Petrovsk-Zabaykalsky serves as the administrative center of Petrovsk-Zabaykalsky District and is subordinated to it. As a municipal division, the town of Petrovsk-Zabaykalsky is incorporated as Petrovsk-Zabaykalsky Urban Okrug.

Economy and transportation
There is a glass plant, a sawmill, and food factories in Petrovsk-Zabaykalsky. The town is a railroad station on the Trans-Siberian Railway, and on the Chita–Ulan-Ude route.

References

Notes

Sources

Дворниченко Н. Е., Земля за Байкалом, Иркутск, 1970
Прыжов И. Г., Пушкарев Л. Н., Декабристы в Сибири на Петровском Заводе, М., 1985

External links
 Mojgorod.ru. Entry on Petrovsk-Zabaykalsky
 Unofficial site of Petrovsk-Zabaykalsky

Cities and towns in Zabaykalsky Krai
Transbaikal Oblast